This is a list of state and territorial capitols in the United States, the building or complex of buildings from which the government of each U.S. state, the District of Columbia, and the organized territories of the United States, exercise its authority. While most states (39 of the 50) use the term "capitol" for their state's seat of government, Indiana and Ohio use the term "Statehouse" and eight states use "State House": Maine, Maryland, Massachusetts, New Hampshire, New Jersey, Rhode Island, South Carolina, and Vermont. Delaware has a "Legislative Hall".  The State of Alabama has a State Capitol, but the Legislature has, since 1985, met in the State House.

A capitol typically contains the meeting place for its state's legislature and offices for the state's governor, though this is not true for every state. The legislatures of Alabama, Nevada, and North Carolina meet in other nearby buildings, but their governor's offices remain in the capitol. The Arizona State Capitol is now strictly a museum and both the legislature and the governor's office are in nearby buildings. Only Arizona does not have its governor's office in the state capitol, though in Delaware, Ohio, Michigan, Vermont, and Virginia, the offices there are for ceremonial use only.

In nine states, the state's highest court also routinely meets in the capitol: Indiana, Kentucky, Nebraska, North Dakota, Oklahoma (both civil and criminal courts), Pennsylvania (one of three sites), South Dakota, West Virginia, and Wisconsin. The other 40 states have separate buildings for their supreme courts, though in Michigan, Minnesota, and Utah the high court also has ceremonial meetings at the capitol.

Eleven of the fifty state capitols do not feature a dome: Alaska, Florida, Hawaii, Louisiana, New Mexico, New York, North Dakota, Ohio, Oregon, Tennessee, and Virginia.

Forty-four capitols are listed on the National Register of Historic Places, marked with NRHP. Nineteen of those are further designated as National Historic Landmarks, marked with NHL. 



State capitols

Territorial and federal district capitols

See also
 List of capitals in the United States
 Chickasaw Nation Capitols
 Chickasaw Capitol Building
 Choctaw Capitol Building

References

External links

Cupolas of Capitalism State Capitol Building Histories. Cupola.com.

Capitols
Capitols
U.S. state and territorial capitols